Nahed El Sebai (born 25 May 1987) is an Egyptian actress. She has appeared in more than ten films since 2004. She is the granddaughter of Farid Shawki and Huda Sultan.

Selected filmography

References

External links
 

1987 births
Living people
Egyptian film actresses
Egyptian television actresses